Paul Cornelius  Reilly (1890–1984) was an American architect who designed many buildings for Catholic clients. He is also remembered for his design of Manhattan theatres.

Early life and architectural education
Reilly was born in New York City and studied in the public schools of the city. He graduated from Columbia University and, early in his career, was chief designer for the former New York City architectural firm of Thomas W. Lamb.

Architectural practice
During the 1920s, Reilly entered into a partnership with Douglas Pairman Hall forming a firm named Reilly and Hall. Mr Reilly's theaters were produced by this firm. Later, Reilly would continue to practice under his own name.

Reilly's son, Paul W. Reilly also became an architect and worked for a time with his father before opening a practice under his own name.

Personal life
Mr. Reilly was also closely associated with the Roman Catholic Archdiocese of New York. He was a member of the Cardinal's Committee of the Laity and once held the post of architect of St. Patrick's Cathedral, New York. His son was the architect Paul W. Reilly.

Works
 Sacred Heart Cathedral Newark, New Jersey (modifications)
 Church of Our Saviour New York City
 Sacred Heart Church, Hartsdale, New York
 Church of the Transfiguration, Collingswood, New Jersey
 Our Lady of Lourdes Hospital, Camden, New Jersey
 Capitol Theater, New York City
 Rialto Theater, New York City
 Rivoli Theater, New York City
 Morosco Theater, New York City
 Wellmont Theatre, Montclair, New Jersey
 State Theatre, Schenectady, New York
 Coney Island Theater, Brooklyn, New York City
 St. Ephrem Roman Catholic Church, Brooklyn, New York City
 Newton Theatre, Newton, New Jersey
 Loew's Sheridan Theatre, New York City
 Fugazy Theatre, New York City
 Renovation of the Church of St. Thomas More, New York City
 St. Peter Claver Roman Catholic Church, Montclair, New Jersey

References

Architects of Roman Catholic churches
American ecclesiastical architects
American theatre architects
1890 births
1984 deaths
Architects from New York City
Defunct architecture firms based in New York City
Columbia University alumni
People from West Orange, New Jersey
Architects of cathedrals